The Isotta Fraschini V.5 of 1916 was an Italian eight-cylinder, water-cooled, in-line piston aero engine of World War I. The "V" denoted "Volo" or "flight" rather than piston arrangement.

Design
The V.5's construction was fairly typical of aircraft engines of the period with cast-iron cylinders mounted in pairs with common heads and water jackets. It had much in common with the six-cylinder Isotta Fraschini V.4 and was built at a similar time. Though powerful, it was very heavy and thus, like some other Isotta Fraschini engines, better suited to airships than aircraft.

Applications
 Forlanini airship

Specifications

References

1910s aircraft piston engines
V.5